Leylakabad (also Romanized as Leylakābād; also known as Kalaklū) is a village in Chaharduli Rural District, Keshavarz District, Shahin Dezh County, West Azerbaijan Province, Iran. At the 2006 census, its population was 106, in 23 families.

References 

Populated places in Shahin Dezh County